Hyponephele neoza is a butterfly species belonging to the family Nymphalidae. It is found in India.

References

Hyponephele
Butterflies described in 1868
Butterflies of Asia